Pajaree Thaoto (born 12 October 1992) is a Thai footballer who plays as a forward. She has been a member of the Thailand women's national team.

International goals

References

1992 births
Living people
Women's association football forwards
Pajaree Thaoto
Pajaree Thaoto
Pajaree Thaoto